Frederick Essen (April 22, 1863 – August 18, 1946) was a U.S. Representative from Missouri.

Born near Pond, St. Louis County, Missouri, Essen attended the public schools.
He engaged in agricultural pursuits.
Recorder of deeds of St. Louis County in 1894–1902.
He engaged in newspaper business at Clayton, Missouri, becoming the owner of two papers which he combined under the name of the Watchman-Advocate.
He served as delegate to the Republican National Conventions in 1904, 1908, and 1912.
He served as member of the board of education of Clayton and served as president in 1909–1919.

Essen was elected as a Republican to the Sixty-fifth Congress to fill the vacancy caused by the death of Jacob E. Meeker and served from November 5, 1918, until March 3, 1919.
He was not a candidate for renomination in 1918.
He resumed newspaper activities.
He was also interested in banking.
He died in Creve Coeur, Missouri, August 18, 1946.
He was interred in Bethel Cemetery, Pond, Missouri.

References

1863 births
1946 deaths
County officials in Missouri
People from St. Louis County, Missouri
Republican Party members of the United States House of Representatives from Missouri
School board members in Missouri